Henry Bellows may refer to:

Henry Adams Bellows (justice) (1803–1873), American lawyer, politician, and Chief Justice of the New Hampshire Supreme Court
Henry Adams Bellows (businessman) (1885–1939), American executive and translator
Henry Whitney Bellows (1814–1882), American clergyman